Mama Steps Out is a 1937 American comedy film directed by George B. Seitz and written by Anita Loos. The film stars Guy Kibbee, Alice Brady, Betty Furness, Dennis Morgan, Gene Lockhart and Edward Norris. The film was released on February 5, 1937, by Metro-Goldwyn-Mayer.

Plot
After inheriting a fortune, the Cuppy family of Fort Wayne, Indiana go to France to "broaden" their cultural outlook, although father Leonard (Guy Kibbee), a perfume manufacturer, and daughter Leila (Betty Furness) are not as enthusiastic as mother Ada (Alice Brady). On the way to France, Leila sees Chuck Thompson (Dennis Morgan), a singer on board their ship, whom she used to know, but he refuses to return her enthusiastic attempts to start a romance. Hoping to change his mind, Leila convinces her parents to take a villa in Antibes, where Chuck is appearing with Ferdie Fisher's band. Meanwhile, Ada is bored with staying at the villa and only meeting Americans. When a local priest (Frank Puglia) comes asking for money to save his church, Ada asks him to introduce her to some "cultural" Europeans.

Cast 

Guy Kibbee as Leonard 'Len' Cuppy
Alice Brady as Ada Cuppy
Betty Furness as Leila Cuppy
Dennis Morgan as Chuck Thompson 
Gene Lockhart as Mr. Sims
Edward Norris as Ferdie Fisher
Gregory Gaye as Dmitri 'Didi' Shekoladnikoff
Ivan Lebedeff as Coco Duval
Heather Thatcher as Nadine Wentworth
Frank Puglia as Robert Dalderder
Adrienne D'Ambricourt as Jeanne

References

External links 
 

1937 films
American comedy films
1937 comedy films
Metro-Goldwyn-Mayer films
Films directed by George B. Seitz
American black-and-white films
Films scored by Edward Ward (composer)
1930s English-language films
1930s American films